Christopher Topping (born 6 March 1951) is an English former footballer.

Career
Born in Bubwith, East Riding of Yorkshire, Topping became York City's first ever apprentice professional in 1967. He made his league debut for York in a home game against Newport County on 28 December 1968, aged 17 years old. He signed fully professional terms with York in March 1969 and quickly established himself in the senior side.

References

1951 births
Living people
Footballers from the East Riding of Yorkshire
English footballers
Association football defenders
York City F.C. players
Huddersfield Town A.F.C. players
Scarborough F.C. players
English Football League players
National League (English football) players
People from Bubwith